Benjamin B. Fischer has worked for the United States Central Intelligence Agency (CIA) for nearly 30 years. In recent years, he has been employed by the CIA's Center for the Study of Intelligence. The White House Millennium Council selected his monograph At Cold War's End: US Intelligence on the Soviet Union and Eastern Europe, 1989–1991 (1999) for inclusion in a time capsule at the National Archives to be opened in 2100. In 2002, Fischer was a visiting research fellow at the Norwegian Nobel Institute in Oslo.

References

External links
 CIA Center for the Study of Intelligence

21st-century American historians
American male non-fiction writers
People of the Central Intelligence Agency
Living people
Year of birth missing (living people)
Historians of the Central Intelligence Agency
21st-century American male writers